The 2018 Women's Ford National Hockey League was the 20th edition of the women's field hockey tournament. The competition was held in Wellington, New Zealand between 9–23 September. 

North Harbour won the title for the 4th time, defeating Central 2–0 in the final. Midlands finished in third place after winning the third place match 1–0 over Auckland.

Participating Teams
The following eight teams competed for the title:

 Auckland
 Canterbury
 Capital
 Central
 Midlands
 Northland
 North Harbour
 Southern

Results

Preliminary round

Fixtures

Classification round

Seventh and eighth place

Fifth and sixth place

Third and fourth place

Final

Statistics

Final standings

Goalscorers

References

External links
Official website

Hockey
Ford National Hockey League
New Zealand National Hockey League seasons
Women's field hockey in New Zealand